Santa Teresa has been used by several authors as the name of an invented city.

Ross Macdonald
Santa Teresa was created by Ross Macdonald as a fictionalised version of Santa Barbara, California, in his mystery The Moving Target (1949).  He used it again in several others of his works, including The Galton Case (1959), The Instant Enemy (1968), and The Underground Man (1971).

Sue Grafton
In the 1980s, the writer Sue Grafton began using a fictional Santa Teresa as the setting for her novels featuring her lead character Kinsey Millhone, a fictional female private investigator. Millhone is the protagonist of Grafton's "alphabet mysteries" series of novels. Grafton chose the setting as a tribute to Macdonald, an acknowledged influence. In the Kinsey Millhone version, the town has a population of 85,000 and has a small airport. 

Nearby, Grafton describes a fictional “luxury residential development” laid out on a sprawling expanse of land called Horton Ravine (Hope Ranch in Santa Barbara), which “once belonged to one family, but is now divided into million-dollar parcels”. Although the fictional private investigator Kinsey Millhone acknowledges that “rich is rich”, she contrasts “‘new’ money” Horton Ravine to the “‘old’ money” graciousness of nearby Montebello, a thinly-disguised tribute to real-life Montecito, California.

Some significant locations in Santa Barbara (for example the police station, courthouse and marina) remain in the same location in 'Santa Teresa'. Most street names and some localities are given different but often very similar names. The table below gives a correspondence between named locations in 'Santa Teresa' and their actual names in Santa Barbara, drawn from a reading of the detailed descriptions the narrator Kinsey Millhone gives of her movements around Santa Teresa.

Roberto Bolaño
Roberto Bolaño set his novel 2666 (2004) primarily in a northern Mexican city called Santa Teresa. The novel features female homicides as central theme, inspired largely by female homicides in Ciudad Juárez. This fictional city had already appeared in his earlier novel The Savage Detectives.

Other uses
The fourth Nancy Drew & Hardy Boys Super Mystery, Dangerous Games, is set in Santa Teresa, where Nancy Drew and Frank and Joe Hardy investigate threats to athletes at the International Championship Games.

Notes and references

Fictional populated places in California